Juanita Bartlett (28 February 1927 – 25 February 2014) was an American screenwriter and television producer best known for her work on The Rockford Files and The New Maverick, both starring James Garner. She also worked on Garner's series Nichols, as well as The Greatest American Hero, Scarecrow and Mrs. King, and several others.

Early years
Although she was born in San Francisco, Bartlett spent her early years in Honolulu, Hawaii, after her family moved there. They returned to California when she was 10 years old. After her initial efforts at writing stories for magazines were rejected, she took a job writing scripts for a radio interview program in New York City. She went on to hold secretarial and office management positions while still writing in her spare time.

Career
Bartlett worked for Roy Huggins, Stephen J. Cannell, and Meta Rosenberg, and also became a producer as well as a writer. Huggins noted in a videotaped interview for the Archive of American Television that Bartlett was the only writer with whom he ever worked who changed the structure of some of Huggins' stories and actually improved them.

In 1986, Juanita Bartlett created her own production company originally known as Jadda Productions. Jadda Productions' first production was the second season of Spenser: For Hire, and would later go on to produce the show In the Heat of the Night when it premiered on March 6, 1988. When the second season of In the Heat of the Night premiered, the production company was renamed Juanita Bartlett Productions. After the last In the Heat of the Night movie aired after Hugh O'Connor died, Juanita Bartlett Productions ceased to exist.

In 1979 and 1980, Bartlett was nominated for an Emmy Award for Outstanding Drama Series for her work on The Rockford Files.

Bartlett died on February 25, 2014, three days shy of her 87th birthday.

References

External links

1927 births
2014 deaths
Television producers from California
American women television producers
American television writers
American women television writers
Place of birth missing
American women screenwriters
Writers from San Francisco
Writers from Honolulu
Screenwriters from California
Screenwriters from Hawaii
20th-century American screenwriters
20th-century American women writers
21st-century American women